Stefan Langemann (born 11 July 1990) is a German footballer who plays for FC Preußen Espelkamp.

External links

1990 births
Living people
German footballers
Sportfreunde Lotte players
Arminia Bielefeld players
3. Liga players
SC Wiedenbrück 2000 players
Association football midfielders
People from Detmold
Sportspeople from Detmold (region)
Footballers from North Rhine-Westphalia